Maroun el-Ras is a Lebanese village nestled in Jabal Amel (Mount Amel) in the district of Bint Jbeil in the Nabatiye Governorate in southern Lebanon.

History
In 1596, it was named as a village, Marun er-Ras, in the Ottoman nahiya (subdistrict) of  Tibnin  under the liwa' (district) of Safad, with a population of 97 Muslim households. The villagers paid a fixed tax of 25% on  agricultural products, such as wheat, barley, olive trees, vineyards,  goats and beehives, in addition to "occasional revenues" and an olive oil press; a total of 8,960 akçe.

In 1838 Edward Robinson noted it as a village located on a higher hill than  Yarun. 

In 1881, the PEF's Survey of Western Palestine (SWP)  described it: "A stone village, with some large stones built into walls, containing about 150 Moslems, situated on the top of high hills, with vineyards and arable land; water is obtained from 'Ain Hara, and cisterns in the village." They further noted: "At this village there are a considerable number of well-cut stones and remains, which indicate that there was once a church here similar to that at Yarun; these stones have been mostly found to the west of the village, in vineyards. A capital of a
column, with mediaeval ornamentation, and a small piece of sculptured stone, with leaves and figures as
at Yarun, are in the village. There is also an architrave with a Greek inscription, in three pieces."

In the 1945 statistics the population was counted with  Saliha and Yaroun, and totalled  1070  Muslims  with   11,735 dunams of land, according to an official land and population survey.  Of this,  7,401 dunams were allocated to cereals,  422 dunams were irrigated or used for orchards,   while  58 dunams were built-up (urban) area.

Lebanese Civil War
On March 1, 1978 the village was occupied by a force of 60 Phalangists, drawn from the villages around Ain Ebel, at the behest of the Israeli military and led to believe by Israeli advisors that they would be welcomed with open arms by the inhabitants. The Phalangists had received vague promises of air support from Israel should they be met with resistance, which they never received. Seven Phalangists were killed when Fatah militants and their allied of the Lebanese National Movement arrived, and the rest of the phalangists had to flee. Israeli troops remained in Ain Ebel until Israel's invasion of Lebanon two weeks later.

2006 Lebanon War

The village was the scene of a major confrontation between the Israeli Army and Hezbollah fighters during the 2006 Lebanon War.

Maroun el-Ras is strategically important as it overlooks the surrounding towns.

During the Battle of Maroun al-Ras of the 2006 Lebanon War, the village was partly occupied by Israel, which claimed it was a stronghold for Hezbollah and one of the launching points for rocket attacks on northern Israel.

There are reports that control of the village was contested at the time of the ceasefire. After-battle reports claimed the IDF   troops never fully secured the border area and that Maroun el-Ras was never fully taken.

References

Bibliography

External links
Survey of Western Palestine, Map 4: IAA, Wikimedia commons
Maroun Er Ras, Localiban

Populated places in Bint Jbeil District